Maja Furu Sæteren (born 14 May 2003) is a Norwegian handball player for Larvik HK and Norway's recruit team.

In September 2021 the Norwegian newspaper Verdens Gang named Furu Sæteren as one of the biggest talents in Norwegian handball.

In July 2022, Furu Sæteren and the rest of the Norwegian Junior Team became World Champions after winning 31–29 against Hungary in the finale.

Achievements
Junior World Championship:
Gold Medalist: 2022

References

2003 births
Living people
People from Kragerø
Norwegian female handball players